Jordan David Johnson (born November 18, 1988) is a retired American professional mixed martial artist who formerly competed in the middleweight division of the Ultimate Fighting Championship. A professional since 2014, he also competed for the Resurrection Fighting Alliance and Professional Fighters League.

Background
Johnson was born in Richmond, Virginia, on November 18, 1988. He first started wrestling in 6th grade at Washington Jr High School in Naperville, Illinois. From there, he went on to wrestle for Naperville North High School where he became the Illinois High School State Wrestling Champion his junior year. He moved to Iowa his senior year, placing 3rd in the Iowa state tournament. Upon graduation from high school, Johnson signed on to wrestle at the University of Iowa. He was a two-time University Nationals All-American in freestyle wrestling.

Wrestling career

High school
Johnson won the 2006 Class AA Illinois state heavyweight state title Naperville North High School, and placed third as a sophomore. He placed fifth at NHSCA Senior Nationals his senior year and third at NHSCA Junior Nationals his junior year. Johnson was coached by Danny Knight at Bettendorf High School and Tom Champion at Naperville North High School.

College
Johnson wrestled at the University of Iowa, where he had a career record 25-11.

 2010-2011 Season-Posted a 2–3 record at heavyweight, wrestled at Kaufman-Brand Open and Midlands Championships. 
 2009-2010 Season-Posted a 14–3 record at heavyweight, went 7–2 in dual competition and scored 30 team points while competing for injured starter Dan Erekson, went 5–0 at Carver-Hawkeye Arena, won title at Wisconsin Open and placed second at Grand View Open, letterwinner placed sixth at 120 kg/264.5 pounds at ASICS men's freestyle University National Championships. 
 2008-09 Season-Posted a 9–5 record at heavyweight went 1–3 in dual competitions and 1–2 in Big Ten duals, won title at Duhawk Open and placed second at Grand View Open, also competed at Northern Iowa Open, letterwinner placed third at 120 kg at ASICS men's freestyle University National Championships. 
 2007-2008 Season-redshirted and Posted a 7–4 season record at 197 pounds while competing unattached, placed fourth at Kaufman-Brand Open and fifth at Jim Fox Open, scored two pins, one technical fall and one major decision.

Mixed martial arts career

Early career
Johnson made his amateur MMA debut in 2013, compiling an impressive 3–0 record as a Heavyweight. He then turned professional in 2014, amassing an undefeated professional record of 6–0, while becoming the final RFA champion in the process. In January 2017, Johnson was signed by the UFC.

Ultimate Fighting Championship
Johnson made his promotional debut against Henrique da Silva on January 28, 2017, at UFC on Fox 23. He won the fight via unanimous decision.

Johnson faced Marcel Fortuna on July 7, 2017 at The Ultimate Fighter 25 Finale. He won the fight by unanimous decision.

Johnson faced Adam Milstead on March 3, 2018 at UFC 222.  He won the fight by split decision.

Johnson faced promotional newcomer Adam Yandiev, replacing injured Krzysztof Jotko, on September 15, 2018 at UFC Fight Night 136. He won the fight by submission in the second round.

As Johnson didn't agree with the financial terms of UFC's contract extension offer after the fight with Adam Milstead, he became a free agent after the fight with Yandiev.

Professional Fighters League
On March 21, 2019, Johnson was revealed to be competing in the light heavyweight bracket of Professional Fighters League's second season. He made his debut against Maxim Grishin at PFL 3 on June 6, 2019. He lost the fight by unanimous decision.

Johnson was set to face Tom Lawlor on April 29, 2021 at PFL 2 as the start of the 2021 PFL Light Heavyweight tournament. However, in March, it was announced that Johnson pulled out and was replaced by Antônio Carlos Júnior.  Later, PFL announced that Antônio Carlos Júnior will replace Johnson for the whole season.

Mixed martial arts record

|-
|Loss
|align=center|12-2-1
|Emiliano Sordi
|TKO (punches)
|PFL 10
|
|align=center|1
|align=center|2:01
|New York City, New York, United States
|.
|-
|Win
|align=center|12-1-1
|Rashid Yusupov
|Decision (unanimous)
|rowspan=2 | PFL 9
|rowspan=2 | 
|align=center| 3
|align=center| 5:00
|rowspan=2 | Las Vegas, Nevada, United States
|
|-
|Draw
|align=center|11-1-1
|Maxim Grishin
|Draw (majority)
|align=center|2
|align=center|5:00
|
|-
|Win
|align=center|11-1
|Sigi Pesaleli
|Decision (unanimous)
|PFL 6
|
|align=center| 3
|align=center| 5:00
|Atlantic City, New Jersey, United States
|
|-
|Loss
|align=center|10–1
|Maxim Grishin
|Decision (unanimous)
|PFL 3
|
|align=center| 3
|align=center| 5:00
|Uniondale, New York, United States
|
|-
|Win
|align=center|10–0
|Adam Yandiev
|Submission (arm-triangle choke)
|UFC Fight Night: Hunt vs. Oliynyk 
|
|align=center|2
|align=center|0:42
|Moscow, Russia
|
|-
|Win
|align=center|9–0
|Adam Milstead
|Decision (split)
|UFC 222 
|
|align=center|3
|align=center|5:00
|Las Vegas, Nevada, United States
|
|-
|Win
|align=center|8–0
|Marcel Fortuna
|Decision (unanimous)
|The Ultimate Fighter: Redemption Finale
|
|align=center|3
|align=center|5:00
|Las Vegas, Nevada, United States
|
|-
|Win
|align=center|7–0
|Henrique da Silva
|Decision (unanimous)
|UFC on Fox: Shevchenko vs. Peña
|
|align=center|3
|align=center|5:00
|Denver, Colorado, United States
| 
|-
|Win
|align=center|6–0
|LeMarcus Tucker
|Decision (unanimous)
|RFA 46
|
|align=center|5
|align=center|5:00
|Branson, Missouri, United States
|
|-
|Win
|align=center|5–0
|Shaun Asher
|Submission (rear-naked choke)
|RFA 39
|
|align=center|3
|align=center|2:37
|Hammond, Indiana, United States
|    
|-
|Win
|align=center|4–0
|Ryan Debelak
|Submission (arm-triangle choke)
|RFA 37
|
|align=center|1
|align=center|1:02
|Sioux Falls, South Dakota, United States
|
|-
|Win
|align=center| 3–0
|Gemenie Strehlow
|Submission (anaconda choke)
|RFA 29
|
|align=center|1
|align=center|0:48
|Sioux Falls, South Dakota, United States
|
|-
|Win
|align=center|2–0
|Ryan Scheeper
|TKO (submission to punches)
|PC MMA: Pinnacle Combat 17
|
|align=center|1
|align=center|0:32
|Cedar Rapids, Iowa, United States
|
|-
|Win
|align=center|1–0
|Fernando Smith
|TKO (punches)
|Duel for Domination 7
|
|align=center|1
|align=center|2:01
|Mesa, Arizona, United States
|
|-

Amateur Mixed martial arts record

|-
|Win
|align=center|1–0
|Deon Clash
|Submission (anaconda choke)
|KOTC- Regulators
|
|align=center|1
|align=center|1:48
|Scottsdale, Arizona, United States
|  
|-

See also
 List of male mixed martial artists

References

External links
 
 

1988 births
American male mixed martial artists
Light heavyweight mixed martial artists
Living people
Mixed martial artists from Virginia
Iowa Hawkeyes wrestlers
American male sport wrestlers
American wrestlers
People from San Diego
University of Iowa alumni
Mixed martial artists from Iowa
Middleweight mixed martial artists
People from Bettendorf, Iowa
People from Scott County, Iowa
People from Richmond, Virginia
Ultimate Fighting Championship male fighters
Mixed martial artists utilizing collegiate wrestling